WROE-LP (95.7 FM, "Radio Free Roanoke, 95.7 FM") is a radio station licensed to serve the community of Roanoke, Virginia. The station is owned by Radio Free Roanoke, Inc., and airs a variety format.

The station was assigned the WROE-LP call letters by the Federal Communications Commission on June 4, 2015.

References

External links
 Official Website
 FCC Public Inspection File for WROE-LP
 

ROE-LP
ROE-LP
Radio stations established in 2018
2018 establishments in Virginia
Variety radio stations in the United States
Roanoke, Virginia